This is a list of Members of Parliament (MPs) elected to the first parliament in the reign of King Charles I in 1625, which was known as the Useless Parliament.

The first parliament began on 21 June 1625 and was held to 11 July 1625 when it adjourned to Oxford because of fear of plague in London. It then sat from 1 August 1625 to 12 August 1625 when it was dissolved. It gained its name because it transacted no significant business, but it was most 'useless' from the king's point of view.

List of constituencies and members

See also
List of parliaments of England
Useless Parliament

References
D. Brunton & D. H. Pennington, Members of the Long Parliament (London: George Allen & Unwin, 1954)
Cobbett's Parliamentary history of England, from the Norman Conquest in 1066 to the year 1803 (London: Thomas Hansard, 1808)
Browne Willis Notitia parliamentaria, or, An history of the counties, cities, and boroughs in England and Wales: ... The whole extracted from mss. and printed evidences 1750 pp198-

Parliaments of Charles I of England
1625 in England
1625 in politics
1625
List